Arm River is a provincial electoral district for the Legislative Assembly of Saskatchewan, Canada. This constituency is located in south central Saskatchewan. Revived as a result of the 2013 revision of Saskatchewan's electoral districts, it was last contested in the 2020 election.

Arm River was originally created before the 2nd Saskatchewan general election in 1908. The Representation Act, 2002 (Saskatchewan) merged this riding's first incarnation with parts of the Watrous and Last Mountain-Touchwood ridings to form the riding of Arm River-Watrous. Arm River-Watrous was abolished by The Representation Act, 2013 (Saskatchewan).

Member of the Legislative Assembly

Election results

Arm River, 2016–

Arm River, 1905–2003

See also
Electoral district (Canada)
List of Saskatchewan provincial electoral districts
List of Saskatchewan general elections
List of political parties in Saskatchewan

References

 Saskatchewan Archives Board: Saskatchewan Executive and Legislative Directory

Saskatchewan provincial electoral districts